is a city located in Mie Prefecture, Japan. , the city had an estimated population of 310,259 in 142162 households and a population density of 1500 persons per km².

Geography
Yokkaichi is located in north-central of Mie Prefecture, part of the northeastern Kii Peninsula. It stretches the width of Mie Prefecture, and is bordered by Ise Bay on the Pacific Ocean to the east, and Shiga Prefecture to the northwest.

Neighboring municipalities
Mie Prefecture
 Kuwana
 Suzuka
 Inabe
 Komono
 Asahi
 Kawagoe
 Tōin
Shiga Prefecture
 Kōka

Climate
Yokkaichi has a Humid subtropical climate (Köppen Cfa) characterized by warm summers and cool winters with light to no snowfall.

Demographics
Per Japanese census data, the population of Yokkaichi has increased steadily over the past 60 years.

History

The area around modern Yokkaichi has been settled since prehistoric times. Numerous Kofun period burial mounds have been discovered, and the area was one of the battle sites of the Asuka period Jinshin War. However, until the end of the Heian period, the area was sparsely settled, and the site of Yokkaichi was only a small port village. The area developed during the Kamakura period and by the Azuchi–Momoyama period, the port was developed and a regular market was opened on the 4th, 14th, and 24th day each month. Thus, the city is named Yokkaichi:  "yokka" means fourth day, and "ichi" means market.  After the Honnō-ji Incident during which warlord Oda Nobunaga was assassinated, Tokugawa Ieyasu fled from Yokkaichi port by sea to his castle at Edo. Under the Tokugawa shogunate, Yokkaichi was tenryō territory controlled directly by the shōgun and administered by a daikan based at the Yokkaichi Jin'ya. Throughout the Edo period, the area prospered as Yokkaichi-juku, the forty-third station on the Tōkaidō highway connecting Edo with Kyoto. However, the city was largely destroyed by the Ansei great earthquakes.

Following the Meiji Restoration, Yokkaichi Town was established with the creation of the modern municipalities system on April 1, 1889 and was designated the capital of Mie Prefecture. Yokkaichi's port advanced remarkably during the Meiji period, primarily under the guidance of Inaba Sanuemon, a resident merchant interested in increasing trade in the Yokkaichi and Ise area by modernizing the port facilities. Starting in 1872, the project took 12 years to complete due to typhoons and difficulties in financing the project. This led to the port city being designated an Official International Port in 1899 The primary trade items shipped through Yokkaichi were originally seed oil, Banko ware, and Ise tea; but now it has developed into a port that handles cotton, wool, glass, and heavy equipment. Yokkaichi was elevated to city status on August 1, 1897.

From 1939, Yokkaichi became a center for the chemical industry, with the Imperial Japanese Navy constructing a large refinery near the port area. Yokkaichi was one of the first cities bombed by the United States during World War II, when on April 18, 1942, the city was attacked by aircraft from the Doolittle Raid. During the final stages of World War II, on June 18, 1945, 89 B-29 Superfortress bombers dropped 11,000 incendiary bombs destroying 35% of the urban area and killing 736 people. This attack on Yokkaichi was followed by another eight air raids until August 8, 1945, killing another 808 people.

From 1960 to 1972, the city residents suffered health problems caused by the emission of SOx into the atmosphere from local petrochemical and chemical plants. In Japan, a disease called Yokkaichi zensoku (Yokkaichi asthma) derives its name from the city, and it is considered one of the Four Big Pollution Diseases of Japan.

Yokkaichi attained special city status on November 1, 2000, with increased local autonomy.

On February 7, 2005, the town of Kusu (from Mie District) was merged into Yokkaichi.

Government
Yokkaichi has a mayor-council form of government with a directly elected mayor and a unicameral city council of 34 members. Yokkaichi contributes seven members to the Mie Prefectural Assembly. In terms of national politics, the city is divided between Mie 2nd district and Mie 3rd district of the lower house of the Diet of Japan.

Economy
Yokkaichi is a manufacturing center that produces Banko ware (a kind of earthenware and stoneware), automobiles, cotton textiles, chemicals, tea, cement, and computer parts such as flash memory by Toshiba subsidiary Yokkaichi Toshiba Electronics.

Education

Universities
Yokkaichi University
Yokkaichi Nursing and Medical Care University
Humanitec Junior College

Primary and secondary education 
Yokkaichi has 38 public elementary schools and 22 public middles schools operated by the city government and there are three private middle schools. The city also operates one special education school for the disabled. The city has ten public high schools operated by the Mie Prefectural Board of Education and five private high schools. Ten prefecture also operates two special education schools for the disabled.

International schools
  — Brazilian school
  — North Korean school

Transportation

Railway
 JR Tōkai – Kansai Main Line
  -   -   -  - 
 Kintetsu Railway – Nagoya Line
 -  -  -  -  -  -  -  -  - 
 Kintetsu Railway – Yunoyama Line
 -  -  -  -  - 
Yokkaichi Asunarou Railway – Utsube Line
Asunarou Yokkaichi -  -  -  -  -  -  - 
Yokkaichi Asunarou Railway – Hachiōji Line
  - 
 Sangi Railway – Sangi Line
 -  -  -  -   -  -

Highway

Seaports
Yokkaichi Port

Local attractions

Festivals and events 
Amagasuka Ishidori Festival
Great Yokkaichi Festival
Matsubara Ishidori Festival

International relations
Yokkaichi has two sister cities and one sister port.
  Long Beach, California, U.S. - October 7, 1963
  Tianjin, China - October 28, 1980
  Sydney Port, Australia - October 24, 1968

Notable people from Yokkaichi
Goseki Kojima, manga artist
Masayo Kurata, voice actress 
Miki Mizuno, actress
Fumio Niwa, author
Toshiya Fujita, movie director
Katsuya Okada, politician
Takuya Okada, chairman emeritus of AEON Group
Katsuaki Watanabe, president of Toyota Motor Corporation
Satoshi Saida, wheelchair tennis player
Naoki Segi, movie director
Shuu Shibutani, professional wrestler
Mayu Mukaida, amateur wrestler Her coach is Shoko Yoshimura.
Yoriko Shono, writer
Ōzutsu Takeshi, sumo wrestler
Ui Shigure, light novel artist and virtual YouTuber

References

External links

 
 Yokkaichi Information, Movie, and Community Portal  TranslatablePage
 Hiroshige prints of the Tokaido - Station 44 Yokkaichi 
 

 
Cities in Mie Prefecture
Port settlements in Japan
Populated coastal places in Japan